The 2022–23 season is Juventus Football Club's 125th season in existence and their 16th consecutive season in the top flight of Italian football. In addition to the domestic league, Juventus is participating in this season's editions of the Coppa Italia, UEFA Champions League and UEFA Europa League.

On 20 January 2023, Juventus were deducted 15 points as punishment for capital gain violations. The decision is subject to appeal.

Players

Squad information
Players, appearances, goals and squad numbers last updated on 31 January 2023. Appearances and goals include league matches only.Note: Flags indicate national team as has been defined under FIFA eligibility rules. Players may hold more than one non-FIFA nationality.

Transfers

Summer 2022

In

Out

Other acquisitions

Other disposals

Winter 2022–23

Out

Other acquisitions

Other disposals

Pre-season and friendlies

Competitions

Overview

Serie A

League table

Results summary

Results by round

Matches
The league fixtures were announced on 24 June 2022.

Coppa Italia

UEFA Champions League

Group stage

The draw for the group stage was held on 25 August 2022.

UEFA Europa League

Knockout phase

Knockout round play-offs
The draw for the knockout round play-offs was held on 7 November 2022.

Round of 16
The draw for the round of 16 was held on 24 February 2023.

Quarter-finals
The draw for the quarter-finals was held on 17 March 2023, 13:00 CET.

Statistics

Appearances and goals

|-
! colspan=14 style=background:#DCDCDC; text-align:center| Goalkeepers

|-
! colspan=14 style=background:#DCDCDC; text-align:center| Defenders

|-
! colspan=14 style=background:#DCDCDC; text-align:center| Midfielders

|-
! colspan=14 style=background:#DCDCDC; text-align:center| Forwards

|-
! colspan="18" style="background:#dcdcdc; text-align:center"| Players transferred during the season

|}
Last updated: 12 March 2023

Goalscorers 

Last updated: 19 March 2023

Notes

See also 
2022–23 Juventus Next Gen season
2022–23 Juventus F.C. (women) season

References

Juventus F.C. seasons
Juventus F.C.
Juventus F.C.